is a passenger railway station located in the city of Matsusaka,  Mie Prefecture, Japan, operated by the private railway operator Kintetsu Railway.

Lines
Matsugasaki Station is served by the Yamada Line, and is located 5.7 rail kilometers from the terminus of the line at Ise-Nakagawa Station.

Station layout
The station consists of two elevated opposed side platforms connected by an underground passage. The station is unattended.

Platforms

Adjacent stations

History
On November 3, 1937 the station was rebuilt on a new location 300-meters closer towards Ise-Nakagawa Station, and renamed to its present name. On March 15, 1941, the Sangu Express Electric Railway merged with Osaka Electric Railway to become a station on Kansai Express Railway's Yamada Line. This line in turn was merged with the Nankai Electric Railway on June 1, 1944 to form Kintetsu.

Passenger statistics
In fiscal 2019, the station was used by an average of 533 passengers daily (boarding passengers only).

Surrounding area
ÆON Marm shopping center (Jusco)
Apita department store

See also
List of railway stations in Japan

References

External links

 Kintetsu: Matsugasaki Station

Railway stations in Japan opened in 1930
Railway stations in Mie Prefecture
Stations of Kintetsu Railway
Matsusaka, Mie